Sarcophaginae is a subfamily of flesh flies (insects in the family Sarcophagidae). There are at least 60 genera and 250 described species in Sarcophaginae.

Genera

References

Further reading

External links

 

Sarcophagidae
Brachycera subfamilies
Taxa named by Pierre-Justin-Marie Macquart